The Indian Forester is a peer-reviewed scientific journal covering research in forestry. It is one of the oldest forestry journals still in existence in the world. It was established in 1875 and is published by the Indian Council of Forestry Research and Education.

See also 
 List of forestry journals

References

External links 
 
  The Indian forester, January 1893 issue (online) at Archive.org
 The Indian forester, Vol XXIV, 1898

Publications established in 1875
Forestry journals
Forestry in India
English-language journals
Monthly journals
Academic journals published by learned and professional societies of India